The Violent Years is a 1956 American exploitation film directed by William Morgan and starring Jean Moorhead as Paula Parkins, the leader of a gang of juvenile delinquent high school girls. The film is notable for having an uncredited Ed Wood as the author of its screenplay. It was released in 1956 on a double bill with the German import Conchita and the Engineer (aka Macumba).

Plot

The gang's core members—besides Paula—are Georgia, Phyllis, and Geraldine ("George", "Phil", and "Gerry" for short).

(The film implies that Sheila is in league with the Communist Party and their anti-American movement.) Gerry and Phil are fatally shot while fleeing the wrecked school; Paula herself guns down one of the cops. Seeking refuge from the police, George and Paula return to Sheila's, where they report their wrecking of the school. But Sheila, who never had any intention of paying the girls, attempts to have them arrested as "loose ends"; as she reaches for the phone, Paula shoots and kills her. A highway patrolman notices the girls driving Sheila's car and wearing clothes from her wardrobe. In the heat of the ensuing car chase, the girls crash their car through a store's plate-glass window; George is killed and Paula is hospitalized. Because Paula is a minor and therefore ineligible for the death penalty, the judge sentences her to life imprisonment without possibility of parole. However, Paula gets a reprieve of sorts...dying from the complications of giving birth to a child she accidentally conceived during her make-out party with Sheila's fellow mobsters. The judge who delivered Paula's conviction also denies Jane and Carl custody of their granddaughter, based on the neglectful way they raised Paula.

The cynical tag line "So what?" is used repeatedly by the girls to underscore their uncaring, nihilistic attitude.

Cast
 Jean Moorhead as Paula Parkins
 Barbara Weeks as Jane Parkins
 Arthur Millan as Carl Parkins
 Theresa Hancock as Georgia
 Glen Corbett as Barney Stetson
 Joanne Cangi as Geraldine
 Gloria Farr as Phyllis
 Lee Constant as Sheila
 I. Stanford Jolley as Judge Clara
 Timothy Farrell as Lt. Holmes
 F. Chan McClure as Det. Artman
 Bruno Metsa as Manny
 Harry Keaton as Doctor

Production
The screenplay, originally titled Teenage Girl Gang, was written (without billing) by Edward D. Wood, Jr., the director of Glen or Glenda and Plan 9 from Outer Space. The Violent Years was the most financially successful film with creative input from Ed Wood.
Star Jean Moorhead was the Playboy Playmate for October 1955.

The film's working title was "Teenage Killers". Although the opening credits indicate that Headliner Productions copyrighted the film in 1956, it is not included in the Copyright Catalog. The Violent Years was actually based on the story by Roy Reid.

Critical reception
Film historian Leonard Maltin savaged the picture: "Tawdry and preachy, with wooden-Indian acting all around...Fans of the one, the only, Ed Wood are in for a treat; however, if it's another Clockwork Orange you're expecting, bring plenty of salt!"

In popular culture
The industrial metal band Ministry incorporated many lines of the film's dialogue in their song "So What?" from the 1989 album The Mind Is a Terrible Thing to Taste.  Long stretches of the judge's monologue are used in two different parts of the song ("you have had all that money can give you...", "kill for a thrill", etc), as well as multiple characters' readings of the song's titular line.

The film was mocked on a 1994 episode of Mystery Science Theater 3000 (Season 6, Episode 10). Subjects for jokes included the occasionally wooden acting, the same car-on-road shots being repeated, and the judge's rambling closing monologue.

Home media
The film was released on VHS several times, including a release under Rhino's "Teenage Theater" banner- hosted by Mamie Van Doren. The film received several DVD releases of varying quality, one from Something Weird Video,  as part of the Ed Wood box set Big Box of Wood, and the box set of vintage exploitation films called Girls Gone Bad.

In 2017, the film was released on Blu-ray through a partnership by Something Weird Video and the American Genre Film Archive (AGFA) including a commentary track from Frank Henenlotter and Rudolph Grey.

See also
List of American films of 1956
Girls with guns
Ed Wood filmography

References

 The Haunted World of Edward D. Wood, Jr. (1996), documentary film directed by Brett Thompson
 Rudolph Grey, Nightmare of Ecstasy: The Life and Art of Edward D. Wood, Jr. (1992)

External links 

 
 

1956 films
1956 crime drama films
1950s teen drama films
American black-and-white films
American exploitation films
American crime drama films
Films with screenplays by Ed Wood
Films directed by William Morgan (director)
American teen drama films
Articles containing video clips
Films about juvenile delinquency
1950s English-language films
1950s American films